The New South Wales Tulloch suburban carriage stock were a type of electric multiple unit operated by the New South Wales Government Railways and its successors between 1940 and 1992. In their later years, they were nicknamed Red Rattlers.

History
In 1940, 24 first series power cars and 24 trailer cars were built by Tulloch Limited for the New South Wales Government Railways. These differed from the 1920s built carriages in having a pillar between the doors to increase passenger circulation space.

In 1951, a further three first series power cars were delivered, followed between May 1952 and March 1956 by 47 second series power cars, which featured an enlarged guard's compartment. Between July 1950 and October 1957, 105 trailer cars were built. They operated in sets with the 1920s built carriages across the Sydney suburban network.

Between 1968 and 1975, some power cars were fitted with two motor air suspended bogies. These were renumbered upwards by 4000, e.g. C3453 became C7453.

Originally painted Tuscan red, from 1973 they were repainted in the Public Transport Commission blue and white livery before the livery was changed to Indian red in 1976. The interiors were painted in two-tone green.

Overhauls of the stock continued up until 1988, with some receiving sliding aluminum Beclawat windows to alleviate rust problems. Withdrawals commenced in the 1980s, 94 remained in service with CityRail in July 1991. The last were withdrawn in 1992. Several have been preserved.

Transport Heritage NSW / Sydney Trains has two Tulloch cars in the care of Historic Electric Traction.
C7485 - Tulloch (4 motor) Power Car (ex C3485) - Stored at Redfern Carriageworks
T4554 - Tulloch Trailer Car - Under Restoration at Redfern Carriageworks

References

Electric multiple units of New South Wales
Train-related introductions in 1940
1500 V DC multiple units of New South Wales